Nick de Jong (born 26 September 1989) is a Dutch former professional footballer who played as a forward.

Career
De Jong was born in Hoofddorp. He made his debut for FC Utrecht on 5 October 2008, in a 3–0 home victory over FC Twente. He scored the third goal of the match, making him the third Utrecht player in a few months time to score in his debut (after Randy Wolters and Rafael Uiterloo).

On 28 May 2010, de Jong left FC Utrecht and signed for HSV Hoek.

Career statistics

Notes

External links
Nick de Jong at Voetbal International

Living people
1989 births
People from Haarlemmermeer
Association football forwards
Dutch footballers
FC Utrecht players
HSV Hoek players
Eredivisie players
Footballers from North Holland